Isodiametra is a genus of worms belonging to the family Isodiametridae.

The species of this genus are found in Southern America.

Species

Species:

Isodiametra bajaensis 
Isodiametra colorata 
Isodiametra cuernos

References

Acoelomorphs